Henry Thomas Reed (October 1, 1846 – February 22, 1924) was a United States district judge of the United States District Court for the Northern District of Iowa.

Education and career

Born in Alburgh, Vermont, Reed read law in 1870. He was in private practice in Cresco, Iowa from 1870 to 1904. He was a member of the Iowa House of Representatives in 1876.

Federal judicial service

Reed was nominated by President Theodore Roosevelt on March 5, 1904, to a seat on the United States District Court for the Northern District of Iowa vacated through the retirement of Judge Oliver Perry Shiras. He was confirmed by the United States Senate on March 7, 1904, and received his commission the same day. After over fifteen years of active service, he assumed senior status on November 30, 1921. Reed's service ended when he died at his home in Cresco on February 22, 1924.

References

Sources
 

1846 births
1924 deaths
Members of the Iowa House of Representatives
Judges of the United States District Court for the Northern District of Iowa
United States district court judges appointed by Theodore Roosevelt
20th-century American judges
People from Alburgh, Vermont
Iowa lawyers
People from Cresco, Iowa
United States federal judges admitted to the practice of law by reading law